Tail of the Sun, known in Japan as , is an action role-playing video game developed by Artdink for the PlayStation. It was released in Japan in 1996 by Artdink and North America in 1997 by Sony Computer Entertainment. It was created by Kazutoshi Iida, who worked on Aquanaut's Holiday and would later work with Nintendo on Doshin the Giant.

The player's ultimate objective is to build a tower of mammoth tusks that reaches the sun. To this end, a large map full of various creatures and oddities must be traversed in an effort to locate and gather sufficient food for the tribe to thrive and multiply.

The game was re-released in Japan on PlayStation 3 and PlayStation Portable as a PSone Classic in 2006, and on the PlayStation Network the same year.

Gameplay
When the game begins, the player is situated at the home village with no goals, objectives, or guidance. The protagonist is free, from the outset, to go nearly anywhere and do basically anything. The landscape the player character inhabits is not only shared by a variety of polygonal fauna, but by flora rendered in the form of Mochi of various shapes and colors, which have varying effects on one's health and various stats.

While exploring the landscape, the player's character will need to sleep, and will often choose to do so while in the middle of hunting or swimming. The North American release allows the player to wake the caveman up when this occurs.

Reception

The game received mixed reviews. In Japan, Famitsu gave it a score of 29 out of 40.

The game has been called a spiritual successor to Artdink's earlier 'non-game' Aquanaut's Holiday. As with Aquanaut's Holiday, its relaxed gameplay style polarized reviewers. On one end, Next Generation said, Tail of the Sun "doesn't fit neatly into any one genre but still gives gamers most everything they want - challenge, tension, humor, and fun - in a way that hasn't been done before." The reviewer also praised the combination of ludicrous and serious concepts and the graphical style. On the other end, the four reviewers of Electronic Gaming Monthly judged the game to be innovative but impenetrable and dull. They were irritated by the player character's falling asleep, and found the game world "surprisingly barren", the graphics primitive, and the premise excessively high concept.

Like EGM, GameSpot contested the idea that the minimalist graphics are stylistically appropriate rather than simply crude ("Tail of the Suns prehistoric schtick ... seems like an excuse for its often lackluster presentation"), and found both the static camera and the player character's passing out when sleep-deprived irritating. They did praise the way the graphics reflect the passage of time and seasons, but concluded that "there just isn't enough variety here to keep the attention of the upright-walking." Entertainment Weekly had a more mixed response: "Slower than a woolly mammoth, Tail of the Sun won’t likely leave you hollering 'Yabba-dabba-doo,' but it will provide a tranquil alternative to the usual hyperactive videogame fare." GamePro similarly commented that while the slow pace (particularly the player character's slow walking speed and tendency to fall asleep) would not be for everyone, the sheer weirdness, crude yet appealing graphics, and "simple but engrossing strategy" of gameplay mechanics such as eating specific foods to increase stats make it enjoyable.

Notes

References

External links

1996 video games
Action role-playing video games
Artdink games
Open-world video games
PlayStation (console) games
PlayStation Network games
Prehistoric people in popular culture
Role-playing video games
Single-player video games
Sony Interactive Entertainment games
Survival video games
Video games developed in Japan
Video games set in prehistory